Route 363, also known as Coomb's Cove Road, is a  east–west highway on the Connaigre Peninsula of the island of Newfoundland. It is located entirely with the town of St. Jacques-Coomb's Cove, connecting the communities on the western half of town with Route 362 (Belleoram Road).

Route description

Route 363 begins at a fork in the road in Coomb's Cove and winds its way east along the coastline of Fortune Bay to have an intersection with a local road leading to Wreck Cove. The highway has an intersection with a road leading to Boxey before passing through Mose Ambrose and English Harbour West. Route 363 now winds its way inland through hilly terrain for several kilometres before coming to an end at an intersection with Route 362.

Major intersections

References

363